Titans of Myth may refer to:

Titan (mythology), one of a group of deities in ancient Greek mythology later overthrown by the Olympian gods
Titans of Myth (comics), DC Comics characters based on the mythological Titans